Phyllolabis is a genus of crane fly in the family Limoniidae.

Species
P. alexanderi Lackschewitz, 1940
P. beesoni Alexander, 1929
P. brunettii Alexander, 1961
P. bryantiana Alexander, 1931
P. claviger Osten Sacken, 1877
P. confluenta Alexander, 1927
P. czizeki Alexander, 1961
P. edwardsi Alexander, 1961
P. encausta Osten Sacken, 1877
P. fenderiana Alexander, 1949
P. flavida Alexander, 1918
P. geigeri Podenas & Stary, 1997
P. ghilarovi Savchenko, 1983
P. gohli Mendl, 1976
P. golanensis Stary & Freidberg, 2007
P. hemmingseni Nielsen, 1959
P. hirtiloba Alexander, 1947
P. hurdi Alexander, 1964
P. kocmani Koc, 2004
P. kumpa Alexander, 1961
P. lackschewitzi Alexander, 1961
P. lagganensis Alexander, 1931
P. latifolia Alexander, 1920
P. laudata Alexander, 1936
P. limboo Alexander, 1961
P. lindneri Mannheims, 1959
P. macroura (Siebke, 1863)
P. mannheimsi Alexander, 1961
P. mannheimsiana Nielsen, 1961
P. mendli Podenas & Stary, 1997
P. meridionalis Alexander, 1945
P. moormi Alexander, 1961
P. myriosticta Alexander, 1945
P. nielseni Mannheims, 1959
P. pallidivena Alexander, 1963
P. parvihalterata 
P. peusi Alexander, 1961
P. pictivena Alexander, 1932
P. pubipennis Lackschewitz, 1940
P. regelationis Alexander, 1953
P. savtshenkoi Theowald, 1981
P. seniorwhitei Alexander, 1961
P. sequoiensis Alexander, 1945
P. theowaldi Mannheims, 1959
P. tjederi Savchenko, 1967
P. vulpecula Alexander, 1936
P. zionensis Alexander, 1948

References

Limoniidae
Tipuloidea genera